The culture of Kerala  has developed over the past millennia, influences from other parts of India and abroad. It is defined by its antiquity and the organic continuity sustained by the Malayali people. Modern Kerala society took shape owing to migrations from different parts of India and abroad throughout Classical Antiquity.

Kerala traces its non-prehistoric cultural genesis to its membership (around the AD 3rd century) in a vaguely defined historical region known as Thamizhagom — a land defined by a common Tamil culture and encompassing the Chera, Chola, and Pandya kingdoms. At that time, the music, dance, language (first Dravida Bhasha — "Dravidian language" — then Tamil), and Sangam (a vast corpus of Tamil literature composed between 1,500–2,000 years ago) found in Kerala were all similar to that found in the rest of Thamizhagom (today's Tamil Nadu). The culture of Kerala evolved through the Sanskritization of Dravidian ethos, revivalism of religious movements and reform movements against caste discrimination. Kerala showcases a culture unique to itself developed through accommodation, acculturation and assimilation of various faculties of civilized lifestyle.

Performing arts 

Native traditions of classical performing arts include koodiyattom, a form of Sanskrit drama or theatre and a UNESCO-designated Human Heritage Art. Kathakali (from katerumbu ("story") and kali ("performance")) is a 500-year-old form of dance-drama that interprets ancient epics; a popularized offshoot of kathakali is Kerala natanam (developed in the 20th century by dancer Guru Gopinath). Meanwhile, koothu is a more light-hearted performance mode, akin to modern stand-up comedy; an ancient art originally confined to temple sanctuaries, it was later popularized by Mani Madhava Chakyar. Other Keralite performing arts include mohiniyaattam ("dance of the enchantress"), which is a type of graceful choreographed dance performed by women and accompanied by musical vocalizations. Thullal, Thirayattam, padayani, and theyyam are other important Keralite performing arts. Thirayattam is one of the most outstanding Ethnic art of Kerala. This vibrant ritualistic annual performing art form enacted in courtyards of "Kaavukal"(sacred groves) and village shrine.

Kerala also has several tribal and folk art forms. For example, Kummattikali is the famous colorful mask-dance of South Malabar, performed during the festival of Onam. The Kannyar Kali dances (also known as Desathukali) are fast-moving, militant dances attuned to rhythmic devotional folk songs and asuravadyas.  Also important are various performance genres that are Islam- or Christianity-themed. These include oppana, which is widely popular among Keralite Muslims and is native to Malabar. Oppana incorporates group dance accompanied by the beat of rhythmic hand-clapping and Vishal vocalizations.

Margam Kali is one of the ancient round group dance of Kerala practiced by Saint Thomas Christians.

However, many of these native art forms largely play to tourists or at youth festivals and are not as popular among ordinary Keralites. Thus, more contemporary forms — including those heavily based on the use of often risqué and politically incorrect mimicry and parody — have gained considerable mass appeal in recent years. Indeed, contemporary artists often use such modes to mock socioeconomic elites. In recent decades, Malayalam cinema, yet another mode of widely popular artistic expression, have provided a distinct and indigenous Keralite alternative to both Bollywood and Hollywood.

Music 

The ragas and talas of lyrical and devotional Carnatic music — another native product of South India — dominates Keralite classical musical genres. Swathi Thirunal Rama Varma, a 19th-century king of Travancore and patron and composer of music, was instrumental in popularising carnatic music in early Kerala. Additionally, Kerala has its own native music system, sopanam, which is a lugubrious and step-by-step rendition of raga-based songs. It is Sopanam, for example, that provides the background music used in Kathakali. The wider traditional music of Kerala also includes melam (including the paandi and panchari variants), as style of percussive music performed at temple-centered festivals using an instrument known as the chenda. Up to 150 musicians may comprise the ensembles staging a given performance; each performance, in turn, may last up to four hours. Panchavadyam is a differing type of percussion ensemble consisting of five types of percussion instruments; these can be utilised by up to one hundred artists in certain major festivals. In addition to these, percussive music is also associated with various uniquely Keralite folk arts forms. Lastly, the popular music of Kerala — as in the rest of India — is dominated by the filmi music of Indian cinema.
The most remembered name in Kerala music culture is of Great Indian musician Sri K. J. Yesudas.

Literature 

The Sangam literature can be considered as the ancient predecessor of Malayalam. Malayalam literature is ancient in origin, and includes such figures as the 14th century Niranam poets (Madhava Panikkar, Sankara Panikkar and Rama Panikkar), whose works mark the dawn of both modern Malayalam language and indigenous Keralite poetry. Some linguists claim that an inscription found from Edakkal Caves, Wayanad, which belongs to 3rd century CE (approximately 1,800 years old), is the oldest available inscription in Malayalam, as they contain two modern Malayalam words, Ee (This) and Pazhama (Old), those are not found even in the Oldest form of Tamil. Sangam works can be considered as the ancient predecessor of Malayalam. The origin of Malayalam calendar dates back to year 825 CE. It is generally agreed that the Quilon Syrian copper plates of 849/850 CE is the available oldest inscription written in Old Malayalam. For the first 600 years of Malayalam calendar, the literature mainly consisted of the oral Ballads such as Vadakkan Pattukal (Northern Songs) in North Malabar and Thekkan Pattukal (Southern songs) in Southern Travancore. The earliest known literary works in Malayalam are Ramacharitam and Thirunizhalmala, two epic poems written in Old Malayalam. Malayalam literature has been presented with 6 Jnanapith awards, the second-most for any Dravidian language and the third-highest for any Indian language.

Designated a "Classical Language in India" in 2013, it developed into the current form mainly by the influence of the poets Cherusseri Namboothiri (Born near Kannur), Thunchaththu Ezhuthachan (Born near Tirur), and Poonthanam Nambudiri (Born near Perinthalmanna), in the 15th and the 16th centuries of Common Era. Kunchan Nambiar, a Palakkad-based poet also significantly influenced the growth of modern Malayalam literature in its early form, through a new literary branch called Thullal. The prose literature, criticism, and Malayalam journalism, began following the latter half of 18th century CE. The first travelogue in any Indian language is the Malayalam Varthamanappusthakam, written by Paremmakkal Thoma Kathanar in 1785.

The Bharathappuzha river, also known as River Ponnani, and its tributaries, have played a major role in the development of modern Malayalam Literature. The words used in many of the Arabi Malayalam works those date back to 16th-17th centuries of Common Era are also very closer to the modern Malayalam language. Unnayi Variyar of 17th-18th centuries, based at Thrissur, played a major role in the development of Attakkatha Literature. The words used in many of the Arabi Malayalam works those date back to 16th-17th centuries of Common Era are also very closer to the modern Malayalam language. The Triumvirate of poets (Kavithrayam: Kumaran Asan, Vallathol Narayana Menon and Ulloor S. Parameswara Iyer) are recognized for moving keralian poetry away from archaic sophistry and metaphysics and towards a more lyrical mode.  The modern Malayalam grammar is based on the book Kerala Panineeyam written by A. R. Raja Raja Varma in late 19th century CE.

In the second half of the 20th century, Jnanpith winning poets and writers like G. Sankara Kurup, S. K. Pottekkatt, Thakazhi Sivasankara Pillai, M. T. Vasudevan Nair, O. N. V. Kurup, and Akkitham Achuthan Namboothiri, had made valuable contributions to the modern Malayalam literature. Later, writers like O. V. Vijayan, Kamaladas, M. Mukundan, Arundhati Roy, and Vaikom Muhammed Basheer, have gained international recognition. Poets like Changampuzha, Uroob, Edasseri Govindan Nair, M. T. Vasudevan Nair, Kamala Surayya, Pallathu Raman, and Edappally Raghavan Pillai also contributed to bring Malayalam poetry to the common man. Later, such contemporary writers as Booker Prize winner Arundhati Roy (whose 1996 semi-autobiographical bestseller The God of Small Things is set in the Kottayam town of Ayemenem) have garnered international recognition. From 1970 to early 1990s, a lot of Malayalam Novelists and story writers contributed to the Literature of Kerala. The contributions from Thakazhi Sivashankara Pillai,
Vaikom Muhammed Basheer P. Kesavadev, Uroob, OV Vijayan, T Padmanabhan, Sethu, Perumbadavam Sreedharan, Kovilan, M. Mukundan, Kakkanadan, Anand and Paul Zacharia,   have been remarkable. Significant contributions from poets and songwriters such as Vayalar Rama Varma, P. Bhaskaran and ONV Kurup have influenced contemporary literature. Critics such as Kuttikrishna Marar and M.P. Paul till the sixties and later, M Krishnan Nair, S. Gupthan Nair, M. K. Sanu, Sukumar Azhikode, K.P. Appan, Narendra Prasad and M. Leelavathy  have added value by providing critical analysis of the books written during the recent past. The writers like Kavalam Narayana Panicker have contributred much to Malayalam drama. Contemporary Malayalam literature deals with social, political, and economic life context. The tendency of the modern poetry is often towards political radicalism.

Arabi Malayalam (also called Mappila Malayalam and Moplah Malayalam) was the traditional Dravidian language of the Mappila Muslim community in Malabar Coast. The poets like Moyinkutty Vaidyar and Pulikkottil Hyder have made notable contributions to the Mappila songs, which is a genre of the Arabi Malayalam literature. The Arabi Malayalam script, otherwise known as the Ponnani script, is a writing system – a variant form of the Arabic script with special orthographic features – which was developed during the early medieval period and used to write Arabi Malayalam until the early 20th century CE. Though the script originated and developed in Kerala, today it is predominantly used in Malaysia and Singapore by the migrant Muslim community.

Folklore

The folklore of Kerala includes elements from the traditional lifestyle of the people of Kerala. The traditional beliefs, customs, rituals etc. are reflected in the folkart and songs of Kerala.
Kerala has a rich tradition of Folklore. Folklore in this region is a spontaneous expression of human behavior and thoughts. Generally speaking, Folklore could be defined as the lore of the common people who had been marginalized during the reign of feudal Kings. The Keralites have their culture and lore which were mostly part of agricultural. Sowing, planting of nharu (seedling), clearing out the weeds, harvests etc. are the different stages of agriculture which have their typical rituals. Numerous songs and performing arts are accompanied with them. Kanyar Kali, Padayani, Mudiyettu, Thirayattam, Malavayiyattam, Theyyam, Kothamooriyattam, Nira, Puthari, etc. are some of the ritual folklore of Kerala. It was under the rule of Kolathiris, the Kings of Kolathunadu, and they codified the rituals, beliefs, taboos and folk performing arts. Even the dates of specific fertility rituals and folk performances were decided by the Kolathiris of which many are continuing even today. The Theyyam festivals, even now, are conducted as per the dates once fixed by the King.

The folk arts of Kerala can be broadly classified under two heads: ritualistic and non-ritualistic. Ritualistic folk arts can be further divided into two: devotional and magical.
Devotional folk arts are performed to propitiate a particular God or Goddess. Theyyam, thirayattam, poothamthira, kanyarkali, kummatti, etc., are some of them. Forms like panappattu and thottampattu are composed in the form of songs. In kolkali, margamkali, daffumuttukkali, etc., the ritualistic element is not very strong. Magical folk arts seek to win general prosperity for a community or exorcise evil spirits or to beget children. Gandharvas and nagas are worshipped in order to win these favours. The magical folk arts include pambinthullal, pooppadathullal, kolamthullal, malayankettu, etc.

Onam

(Malayalam: ഓണം) Onam is a harvest festival celebrated extravagantly by the people of Kerala, India. It is also the state festival of Kerala with State holidays on 4 days starting from Onam Eve (Uthradom) to the 4th Onam Day. Onam Festival falls during the Malayalam month of Chingam (Aug - Sep) and marks the commemoration of Vamana avatara of Vishnu and the subsequent homecoming of King Mahabali, who Malayalees consider to be just and fair King who was exiled to the underworld. Onam is reminiscent of Kerala's agrarian past, as it is considered to be a harvest festival. It is one of the festivals celebrated with the most number of cultural elements. Some of them are Vallam Kali, Pulikkali, Pookkalam, Onatthappan, Thumbi Thullal, Onavillu, Kazhchakkula, Onapottan, Atthachamayame etc.

Another distinct feature of the festival is 'Onam Sadhya' (Onam Feast) and consists of numerous dishes served on a banana leaf and 'Onam Kodi' (new dress for the special occasion). Usual the Onam Sadhya consist of numerous side dishes along with rice and Onam Kodi is traditional dress. Both are eagerly observed by the youth with excitement.

Politics
The people of Kerala are very fond of politics. Majority of keralites belong to either one of the political alliances namely United Democratic Front (UDF) or Left Democratic Front (LDF). Regional parties such as Indian Union Muslim League (IUML), various factions of Kerala Congress, various factions of Revolutionary Socialist Party and a host of smaller parties add spice to Kerala political scene. Religious leaders have high influence in Kerala political movements. For many Keralites it is nostalgic to remember the political discussions and debates they had done in the chaya kada (local tea shops were youngsters go to sip a cup and read newspapers) in their younger ages.

Modern Kerala society 
Being the state with the highest literacy rate and education level in the country, the Kerala society has moved from its agricultural background. Although Kerala remains fairly liberal in its outlook and open to modern ideas, and technological changes, the State largely remains conservative on social issues.

Martial arts and sports 

Kerala also has its own indigenous form of martial art - Kalarippayattu, derived from the words kalari ("place", "threshing floor", or "battlefield") and payattu ("exercise" or "practice"). Influenced by both Kerala's Brahminical past and Ayurvedic medicine, kalaripayattu is attributed by oral tradition to Parasurama. After some two centuries of suppression by British colonial authorities, it is now experiencing strong comeback among Keralites while also steadily gaining worldwide attention. Other popular ritual arts include theyyam and poorakkali — these originate from northern Malabar, which is the northernmost part of Kerala. Nevertheless, these have in modern times been largely supplanted by more popular sports such as cricket, kabaddi, soccer, badminton, and others. 'Kochi Tuskers Kerala' playing in the Indian Premier League (IPL) is from Kerala. Kolkkali is a folk art performed in Malabar region of Kerala, India. The dance performers move in a circle, striking small sticks and keeping rhythm with special steps. Kerala is currently the home of the football clubs Kerala Blasters and Gokulam Kerala FC. Viva Kerala and FC Kochin were the other two major football clubs from the state in the past.

Calendar 

Kerala also has an indigenous ancient solar calendar — the Malayalam calendar — which is used in various communities primarily for timing agricultural and religious activities.

Elephants in Kerala culture

The elephants are an integral part of the culture and daily life in Kerala. These Indian elephants are given a prestigious place in the state's culture. They are often christened names by which they're known across the entire state. Elephants in Kerala are often referred to as the 'sons of the sahya''' and are indispensable for temple festivals. The elephant is the state animal of Kerala and is featured on the emblem of the Government of Kerala.

Sarpa Kavu (meaning Sacred Grove of the Serpent) is a typically small traditional grove of trees seen in the Kerala state of South India. These pristine groves usually have representations of several Naga Devatas (serpent gods), which were worshipped by the joint families or taravads.  This was part of Nagaradhana'' (snake worship) which was prevalent among Keralites during past centuries. It had been practised by nearly every Hindu community in Kerala ranging from Nambudiri Brahmins to tribal communities.

Kerala has a large number of temples. The temples celebrate annual festivals which are not only unique to the region but sometimes have features that are unique to each temple. Each temple describes each interesting history behind its creation. In the Malabar, distinct art form called Theyyam attract tourists, and mini carnivals are also held along with temple festivals. Temple festivals are taken up with great pride by the residents and patrons of the temple and celebrated with much ado. Thrissur pooram is one of the most popular among the temple festivals

See also
Architecture
History
Economy
Geography

Notes

References 
 .

Further reading

External links
 Princeton.edu, more on the performing arts.